George Francis Pyne, Jr. (October 17, 1909 – June 3, 1974) was an American football tackle who played one season with the Providence Steam Roller of the National Football League. He played college football at the College of the Holy Cross and attended Milford High School in Milford, Massachusetts. His son George Pyne III played in the AFL and his grandson Jim Pyne played in the NFL. The Pynes were the first family to have three generations play professional football. His grandson George played football at Brown University and is a businessman.

References

External links
Just Sports Stats

1909 births
1974 deaths
People from Marlborough, Massachusetts
Sportspeople from Middlesex County, Massachusetts
Players of American football from Massachusetts
American football tackles
Holy Cross Crusaders football players
Providence Steam Roller players